Nadia Riquelme (born 15 June 1986) is an Argentine slalom kayaker. In 2019, she won the silver medal in the women's K-1 event at the 2019 Pan American Games held in Lima, Peru.

References

External links 
 

Living people
1986 births
Place of birth missing (living people)
Argentine female canoeists
Pan American Games medalists in canoeing
Pan American Games silver medalists for Argentina
Medalists at the 2019 Pan American Games
Canoeists at the 2019 Pan American Games
21st-century Argentine women